ZNM-FM, more popularly known as More 94 FM is an urban adult contemporary/mainstream urban radio station broadcasting in Nassau, Bahamas.

Radio stations in the Bahamas
Adult contemporary radio stations
Mainstream urban radio stations
Urban contemporary radio stations
Urban adult contemporary radio stations